Kristina Sisco (born April 18, 1982 in Bethesda, Maryland) is an American actress.

Early life
The daughter of a Navy reservist, Sisco moved four times by age 12. Born in Bethesda, Maryland, she moved to Texas and California before returning to Bethesda. At age 13, she began her acting career by working as an amateur reporter for a local Bethesda UPN station. Her exposure led to some modelling jobs and a part in a re-enactment on America's Most Wanted.

Career
In January 1999, Sisco landed the role of Abigail Williams on CBS's daytime drama As the World Turns. The character Abigail was the daughter of the characters Holden Snyder and Molly Conlan.  Sisco received two Emmy Award nominations, in 2001 and 2002. Sisco left the show after three years on October 25, 2002, when the character Abigail left Oakdale to move to Los Angeles with the character Adam.

In late 1998, Sisco won the Miss Maryland Teen USA 1999 title and prepared to compete in the Miss Teen USA pageant, until she was offered the role on As the World Turns, which was to begin filming the week of the pageant.  She was replaced by first runner-up Khosi Roy, who represented Maryland in the nationally televised event and placed second runner-up.

In October 2006, Soap Opera Digest reported that Sisco had been cast in the role of Charity Standish on NBC's daytime drama Passions. The role was previously played by Molly Stanton from July 14, 1999 until Stanton's departure on July 22, 2004. Sisco's first air date was November 14, 2006.

Sisco played the role of Harriet Wells in the 2007 thriller film The Flock.

Personal life
In 2006, she completed a Bachelor of Arts degree in psychology from Thomas Edison State College and was inducted into the Alpha Sigma Lambda national honor society.  Sisco enrolled in the Master of Professional Writing Program at the University of Southern California, graduating in 2008 from the program.

References

External links
Kristina Sisco profile

1982 births
Living people
Actresses from Maryland
American soap opera actresses
People from Bethesda, Maryland
University of Southern California alumni
Thomas Edison State University alumni
21st-century American women